Qingshanqiao is a town in Ningxiang, Hunan, China. It is located at the intersection of Highway S209 and Highway S311, on the banks of the Chu River.

Administrative division
After the adjustment of villages and towns in 2016, it includes eight villages and one community: 
 Qingshanqiao Community
 Furong
 Zhufeng
 Tianping
 Shangliu
 Xintian
 Shishiqiao
 Huayuantang
 Tianxin

Geography
The Tianping Reservoir is the second largest body of water in Ningxiang and the second largest reservoir in Ningxiang, is the source of the Wei River.

The Huayuan Reservoir is a reservoir and the second largest body of water in the town.

The Chu River is known as "Liushahe", a tributary of the Wei River, it flows through Qingshanqiao Town.

Economy

Tea and tobacco are important to the economy.

The Hongjia Mountain and Jianding Mountain contain the manganese ore. Xintian Village's soil contain a rich supply of potassium. The Furong Mountain contains a rich supply of granite.

Education
There are four primary school located with the town limits: Qingshanqiao Central School, Tianping School, Huayuan School, Xintian School.

Public junior high school in the town include the Qingshanqiao Junior High School and Xintian Junior High School.

Culture

Huaguxi is the most influence local theater.

Transportation

National Highway
The National Highway G234 travels through Hutian Town of Xiangxiang to Loudi.

Provincial Highway
Among the major highways that connect Qingshanqiao Town to the rest of Hunan Province include Provincial Highway S209, which runs east through Qiaobei Village to Liushahe Town. The Provincial Highway S311 runs northwest to Gaoming Township. The Provincial Highway S328 runs southeast to Fanjiang Town of Xiangxiang City.

Expressway
The Yilouheng Expressway in the Hunan Province, which heads to Loudi City, Yiyang City and Hengyang City through the town.

The Changshaolou Expressway passes through the southeast of the town.

Railway
The Luoyang–Zhanjiang Railway, from Luoyang City, Henan Province to Zhanjiang City, Guangdong Province, through Qingshanqiao Town at Qingshanqiao Railway Station.

Religion
Puji Temple is the largest Buddhist temple in the town. Located on the top of Furong Mountain of Furong Village, it was originally built in the Yuan dynasty (1271–1368) and later destroyed and rebuilt several times. It was last rebuilt in 2013. Buddha Qing'an is the main target of worship, the temple also worship the Three Saints of the West and Guan Yu.

Situated in Shangliu Village, Shangliu Temple is also a Buddhist temple in the town, which was built in the late Qing dynasty (1644–1911) for worship the Bodhisattva Guanyin and the Jade Emperor.

Huayuan Christian Church is a Christian church which sits in Huayuan Village of the town.

Notable residents
 Writer: Tang Sulan
 Revolutionary martyr: Li Jialong.
 Star: Gong Xianlan, won the Hunan TV's program "Beautiful Village Girl"().

References

Divisions of Ningxiang
Ningxiang